Zeatrophon mortenseni is a species of predatory sea snail, a marine gastropod mollusc in the family Muricidae, the rock snails or murex snails.

Distribution
This marine species is endemic to New Zealand.

References

Further reading 
 Powell A W B, New Zealand Mollusca, William Collins Publishers Ltd, Auckland, New Zealand 1979 
 Finlay H.J. (1930) Additions to the Recent fauna of New Zealand. No. 3. Transactions and Proceedings of the Royal Society of New Zealand 61: 222-247

Gastropods of New Zealand
Pagodulinae
Gastropods described in 1924